Night skiing is the sport of skiing or snowboarding after sundown, offered at many ski resorts and mountains. There are usually floodlights – including LED lamps – along the piste which allow for better visibility. It typically begins after a resort's skiing-day ends (sunset), and ends between 8:00 PM and 10:30 PM.

Night skiing offers a few last runs for busy skiers who don't have time to ski during daylight hours. Trails at night are normally not as busy as during the day, but there are usually fewer runs available. The trails also tend to be icier than during the day, due to melting and refreezing.

While the invention of night skiing is often credited to Webb Moffet in 1945 who used to own Snoqualmie Summit Ski Area near Seattle, Washington, night skiing actually originated with Clare Bousquet at Bousquet Ski Area in Pittsfield, Massachusetts in 1936 thanks to a local partnership with General Electric.

References

External links 
 

Types of skiing
Lighting
Skiing